The Fountain of São Miguel is a fountain located in the civil parish of Cedofeita, Santo Ildefonso, Sé, Miragaia, São Nicolau e Vitória, in the Portuguese north, municipality of Porto, classified as a Imóvel de Interesse Público (Property of Public Interest).

History

The fountain was originally constructed in 1737, from the writings of Gabriel Pedro Velasques.

A second phase of construction occurred in the second half of the 18th century, but occurred in the Largo da Sé following the location of the demolished Arco da Vandoma, and later transferred to the actual location. It was likely ordered constructed by the canons of the Sé Cathedral.

Architecture
The fountain is isolated, leaning against the north facade of the Sé Cathedral of Porto, specifically the parochial sacristy and the Chapel of the Holy Sacrement. Nearby is the Casa da Câmara.

The fountain has a low back and curved profile with wedge-shaped pilasters and an upper cornice forming a curved pediment to the center. A small fountain springs from the central urn to a stone bowl. To the back, wrought iron railing separates the two wedge-shaped urns and central base. The centre is dominated by the main column with lateral curvilinear frontispiece and bas-relief, featuring the Archangel Michael holding a sword and shield and stepping on the devil. The shaft is interrupted by rings and decorative flourishes that rise to support a figure of the archangel Michael.

References

Notes

Sources
 
 
 
 
 

Fountain Sao Miguel
Fountain Sao Miguel